The 1931 Cincinnati Reds season was a season in American baseball. The team finished eighth and last in the National League with a record of 58–96, 43 games behind the St. Louis Cardinals.

Off-season 
On November 24, the Reds were involved in a minor trade, trading infielder Pat Crawford and outfielder Marty Callaghan to the Hollywood Stars of the Pacific Coast League for first baseman Mickey Heath. Heath hit .324 with 37 home runs with the Stars in the 1930 season.

In January, the club selected infielder Clyde Beck off of waivers from the Chicago Cubs. Beck hit .213 with six home runs and 34 RBI during 83 games with Chicago in the 1930 season.

During spring training, outfielder Harry Heilmann was incapacitated due to arthritis of his wrist. He would miss the entire 1931 season due to his injury.

To off-set the loss of Heilmann, the Reds selected outfielder Cliff Heathcote off of waivers from the Chicago Cubs on March 22. Heathcote hit .260 with nine home runs and 18 RBI in 70 games with Chicago in 1930. In nine seasons with the Cubs from 1922-1930, he had a .280 batting average with 33 home runs and 275 RBI, while stealing 121 bases. Heathcote also played with the St. Louis Cardinals from 1918 until being traded to Chicago in 1922.

On March 26, the Reds went back to the waiver wire, selecting former Reds legend Edd Roush from the New York Giants. Roush sat out the 1930 season due to a salary dispute with the Giants. In 1929 with New York, Roush hit .324 with eight home runs and 52 RBI in 115 games. Roush played with the Reds from 1916 until 1926. During his time with Cincinnati, he led the National League in hitting in 1917 with a .341 average and in 1919 when he hit .321. In 1923, he led the NL with 43 doubles, and in 1924, he led the league with 21 triples. Roush won the 1919 World Series with the Reds, when they defeated the Chicago White Sox.

Regular season 
Cincinnati stumbled out of the gate, losing 12 of their first 13 games, quickly falling into last place in the National League. After a 2-17 start to the season, the Reds managed to win three games in a row, including sweeping a double header against the Philadelphia Phillies on May 15.

Wins continued to be few and far between, as the club finally won their 10th game of the season on June 3, defeating the Phillies 3-1 to improve to 10-32. This started a five game winning streak, and a nine game stretch where Cincinnati won eight games.

On June 15, the Reds traded outfielder Wally Roettger to the St. Louis Cardinals for outfielder Taylor Douthit. Douthit had a .331 average with a home run and 21 RBI in 36 games with the Cardinals during the season. In 1929 with the Cardinals, Douthit was among the National League leaders with a .336 batting average.

The club continued to struggle for wins during the rest of the season, as they never were able to climb out of the basement. Cincinnati finished the 1931 season with a league worst record of 58-96, finishing six games behind the Boston Braves for seventh place. The Reds finished 43 games behind the pennant winning St. Louis Cardinals.

The 58 wins by Cincinnati was one fewer than they had in 1930, and the lowest win total in team history since they won 52 games in 1901. The Reds last place finish was the first time the finished that low since 1914.

Third baseman Joe Stripp led the Reds with a .324 average, while hitting three home runs and 42 RBI in 105 games. First baseman Harvey Hendrick hit .315 with a home run and 75 RBI in 137 games, while leading the club with 74 runs. Second baseman Tony Cuccinello also hit .315 while two home runs and a team best 93 RBI in 154 games. Outfielder Edd Roush hit .271 with a home run and 41 RBI in 101 games in his return with the Reds. Overall, Cincinnati hit an NL low 21 home runs during the season.

On the mound, Red Lucas led the club with a 14-13 record and a 3.59 ERA in 238 innings pitched in 29 starts. Lucas had 24 complete games and three shutouts. Si Johnson had a record of 11-19, leading the NL in losses, however, he led the Reds with 262.1 innings pitched and 95 strikeouts in 42 games. Larry Benton had a team-low 3.35 ERA, while posting a 10-15 record, while pitching 204.1 innings pitched.

Season standings

Record vs. opponents

Roster

Player stats

Batting

Starters by position 
Note: Pos = Position; G = Games played; AB = At bats; H = Hits; Avg. = Batting average; HR = Home runs; RBI = Runs batted in

Other batters 
Note: G = Games played; AB = At bats; H = Hits; Avg. = Batting average; HR = Home runs; RBI = Runs batted in

Pitching

Starting pitchers 
Note: G = Games pitched; IP = Innings pitched; W = Wins; L = Losses; ERA = Earned run average; SO = Strikeouts

Other pitchers 
Note: G = Games pitched; IP = Innings pitched; W = Wins; L = Losses; ERA = Earned run average; SO = Strikeouts

Relief pitchers 
Note: G = Games pitched; W = Wins; L = Losses; SV = Saves; ERA = Earned run average; SO = Strikeouts

Farm system

References

External links
1931 Cincinnati Reds season at Baseball Reference

Cincinnati Reds seasons
Cincinnati Reds season
Cincinnati Reds